The Molson Cup is an award presented to a distinguished player on Canadian  ice hockey teams. After each game, the "three game stars" are selected, usually by a member of the media. At the end of the season, the player with the most three-star honours is presented with the Molson Cup. Most teams also donate money to charity in the name of the winner of each monthly segment winner during the season.

The Molson Cup is not an official National Hockey League (NHL) award, but the Canadian NHL franchises have presented the award to its players. It is also bestowed by some minor professional and Canadian Hockey League clubs as well. The Quebec Major Junior Hockey League's Rookie of the Year Award was previously known as the Molson Cup.

The Molson Cup is sponsored by Molson Breweries; many hockey clubs with another brewery sponsor present a similar award with a name related to the sponsor. The Quebec Nordiques awarded an "O'Keefe Cup."

List of winners by team

Active award

Edmonton Oilers

Montreal Canadiens
The Canadiens typically award their Molson Cup monthly; only the end-of-season winners are listed here.

Ottawa Senators

Toronto Maple Leafs

Vancouver Canucks
The Canucks have retitled this award the Three Stars Award in recent years.

Defunct award

Calgary Flames

The Flames last awarded the Molson Cup for the 2010–11 season.

Winnipeg Jets

See also
 Three stars (ice hockey)
 Three-Star Award (Arizona Coyotes award)
 Three Stars Awards (Boston Bruins award)
 Three Stars Award (Columbus Blue Jackets award)
 Normandy Homes Star of the Game Award (Dallas Stars award)
 Three-Star Award (New Jersey Devils award)
 Toyota Cup (Philadelphia Flyers award)
 A. T. Caggiano Memorial Booster Club Award (Pittsburgh Penguins award)
 O'Keefe Cup (defunct Quebec Nordiques award)
 Three Stars of the Year (San Jose Sharks award)
 Three Stars of the Game Award (Winnipeg Jets award)

References

 Calgary Flames: Calgary Flames 2006–07 Media Guide pp. 107–131.
 Ottawa Senators: 
 Toronto Maple Leafs: Toronto Maple Leafs 2015–16 Media Guide pp. 373.
 Vancouver Canucks: Official Canucks Award Winner Archive on Canucks.com

Canadian ice hockey trophies and awards
Molson Coors Beverage Company